Đông Hưng may refer to several places in Vietnam, including:

Đông Hưng District, a rural district of Thái Bình Province
Đông Hưng (township), a township and capital of Đông Hưng District
Đông Hưng, Thanh Hóa, a commune of Thanh Hóa city
Đông Hưng, Kiên Giang, a commune of An Minh District
Đông Hưng, Cà Mau, a commune of Cái Nước District
Đông Hưng, Bắc Giang, a commune of Lục Nam District
Đông Hưng, Haiphong, a commune of Tiên Lãng District

See also
The rural communes of Đông Hưng A and Đông Hưng B in An Minh District, Kiên Giang Province